The QCinema International Film Festival is an annual film festival held in Quezon City, Philippines. The festival showcases local and international films, documentaries, and short films, and gives grants to their creators. As of 2017, the venues for the festival are Trinoma, Gateway Mall, Robinsons Galleria, and U.P. Town Center.

History 
The QCinema International Film Festival was created in 2013 by the Quezon City Film Development Foundation (QCFDC), a Quezon City governmental commission that supported the city's filmmakers. The Circle Competition was created for entrants to compete for their films to be shown at the film festival. Winners of the Circle Competition would be given a seed grant to help them produce more films. Trinoma Mall Cinemas was selected as the venue for the first edition of the film festival.

The first festival was held from October 3 to October 5 of that year, with 3,000 people attending. Only three filmmakers reached the Circle Competition, each winning a seed grant of ₱800,000 (US $10,000~). Their films were selected for promoting nationalism, gender sensitivity, freedom, and excellence. Nine of the New Breed films from the 2013 Cinemalaya Philippine Independent Film Festival were also shown. Additional events included film workshops and talk-back sessions with the winning filmmakers.

In 2014 the festival was held from November 5 to 11, and reached an attendance of 5,000. Thirty-eight films were shown, out of which eight received grants. Film categories were introduced, with "Screen International" highlighting foreign films, and "Children’s Classics" being films produced for children. The festival also featured a filmmakers’ forum.

In 2015 the festival was held from October 22 to 31, with 10,000 people attending. Sixty movies were shown throughout the festival, with eight receiving grants. The "Screen International" and "Children’s Classics" categories returned, with the latter being renamed to "Special Children’s Screening." New film categories included the "International Documentaries", "RainbowQC" (films about the LGBTQ community), "Music Genius" (films about music legends), "Special Halloween Screening", "Throwback Ticket" (digitally restored movies), "Indie Nacional" (homegrown award-winning films), "Reloaded" (films by previous Circle Competition winners), "QCX Anthology", and "Asian Cinerama" (films recognized as outstanding by the Asian Film Awards Academy). Additional events included complimentary film forums and workshops.

In 2016 the festival was held from October 13 to 22, and reached an attendance of 15,000. QCinema screened sixty films, out of which seven full-length films and several short films were given grants. The "Screen International" and "RainbowQC" categories returned, in addition to "Throwback Ticket", which was renamed to "Back Throwback". New film categories included "Cinema Rehiyon" (regional titles) and "Pinoy Spotlight" (social realist films). Additional events included free film seminars, film forums, and workshops.

In 2017 the festival was held from October 19 to 28. The festival opened with "Loving Vincent" and closed with the restored version of "Batch ’81”. Similarly to the previous year's festival, seven films and several short films were given grants, with the "Asian Next Wave", "Screen International", and "RainbowQC" film categories returning. The "Back Throwback" category also returned, again renamed to "Digitally Remastered." New film categories included "Trilogy", "Before Midnight", and "Special Screenings". Additional events included a film conference and an awards ceremony.

Sections 
The festival has seven main sections:

Competition sections

 Asian Next Wave - the main competition section, focuses on emerging filmmakers from Southeast Asia and East Asia with less than three features
 QCinema Shorts - short films by Filipino filmmakers

Exhibition sections

 Screen International - specially-curated section showcasing renowned directors with distinctive styles
 New Horizon - showcases new directors and their acclaimed new works
 RainbowQC - feature and short films on LGBTQ+
 Midnight Series - horror and thriller films
 Asian Shorts Program - curated program for shorts films from Asia

See also
 List of film festivals
 Cinema of the Philippines

References

External links
Official site

Film festivals in the Philippines
2013 establishments in the Philippines
Quezon City